Melbourne Orlando International Airport  is a public airport  northwest of downtown Melbourne, in Brevard County, Florida, United States, and 50 miles southeast of Orlando, located on central Florida's Space Coast. The airport is reached by NASA Boulevard (State Road 508). It is governed by a seven-member board which is appointed by the Melbourne City Council and the private sector. The airport budget is part of the Melbourne municipal budget; the airport receives no local tax dollars. The projected expenses for 2010 were $14.1 million. The executive director of the airport is Greg Donovan, A.A.E.

Since 2015, the airport had been named Orlando Melbourne International Airport. However, due to a lawsuit claiming this name was misleading to passengers, the airport changed its name in May 2021.

History

Early years
Melbourne International Airport began in 1928 when a Pitcairn Aircraft landed on a cow pasture strip north of Kissimmee Highway. Airmail service started in late 1928 when the airport was designated a fueling stop.

Returned to the city as a Surplus Property Airport after the War, Melbourne Airport was deeded to the city in 1947. It was a municipal airport until 1967 when the city created the Melbourne Airport Authority to plan, operate, maintain, and develop the airport, then called Melbourne Municipal Airport. The name was Cape Kennedy Regional Airport and city officials changed the name to Melbourne Regional Airport in 1973 to better reflect its role.

Scheduled airline flights began in 1953. The April 1957 Official Airline Guide listed four Eastern Airlines departures, Martin 4-0-4s to Vero Beach, Daytona Beach and Jacksonville. National Airlines arrived in 1959 with Douglas DC-6Bs and scheduled the first jet airliner flights in 1963: Douglas DC-8s Miami–Melbourne–New Orleans–Houston–Los Angeles and Los Angeles–Houston–Melbourne–Miami.

In 1960, Meadowlane Elementary School first opened at a Naval hospital on the airport grounds. The school moved to West Melbourne in 1961. In 1969, a National DC-8 flew Los Angeles–Tampa–Melbourne–Miami. Houston and Los Angeles figured in NASA's space program, and Melbourne was close to the NASA Kennedy Space Center. In July 1974 a National Boeing 727 flew Miami–Melbourne–Tampa–New Orleans–Los Angeles–San Diego; National Boeing 727-200s flew direct Houston and New Orleans to Melbourne. In May 1979 National had one flight a day from Melbourne, a 727-200 to Tampa.

In the late 1960s and early 1970s, Eastern Airlines Boeing 727s, Douglas DC-9s and Lockheed Electras flew out of the airport. In June 1967 Eastern announced "The Space Corridor" from Melbourne to three centers in the space program: Huntsville, Alabama, St. Louis and Seattle.  Eastern's "Space Corridor" was a Melbourne-Orlando-Huntsville-St. Louis-Seattle Boeing 727-100. In June 1967 Eastern flew nonstop Melbourne to Atlanta, Tampa and Ft. Lauderdale and direct to New York City (JFK Airport), Washington, D.C. (Dulles Airport), Boston and Miami. In February 1976 Eastern flew a 727 direct Los Angeles to Melbourne via Atlanta; Eastern eventually dropped Melbourne upon the airlines closure in 1991.

In the early 1980s some ending scenes for the film Stranger Than Paradise were shot in the Melbourne area, including several plot scenes shot at the airport (as listed in the credits).People Express Airlines started nonstops to Newark, Baltimore, Columbus and Buffalo, New York in spring 1982 with Boeing 737 jets. They eventually scaled back to just nonstops to Newark and ended service to MLB in 1986. Delta Air Lines started nonstops to Atlanta in 1983 with DC-9s and upgraded to Boeing 737s and MD-80s.

The Authority operated a recreational vehicle site, "Port O' Call". This was closed and the tenants evicted in 2003. The intent was to use the property for commercial development. The Melbourne Airport Authority operates Tropical Haven (formerly Trailer Haven), a 760-site manufactured home park.

Development since the 2010s
In 2010 the airport had nonstop flights to Atlanta on Delta Air Lines and regional partner Atlantic Southeast Airlines, as well as nonstops to Charlotte Douglas International Airport on US Airways' regional subsidiary PSA Airlines. These flights continue on Delta and American. Delta used to fly nonstop from Melbourne to its hubs in Cincinnati, New York–Kennedy and New York–La Guardia, and to Washington–Dulles and Washington–Reagan; all of this was discontinued. USA3000 Airlines briefly served Melbourne with flights to Baltimore/Washington. Presidential Airways (scheduled) had nonstop flights to Daytona Beach and Washington, DC (Dulles), with Boeing 737s and BAE-146 Jets. American Airlines served Melbourne with flights to Raleigh/Durham on MD-80 jets and Continental flew to Newark Liberty with 727 and 737 aircraft. Direct Air flew to Niagara Falls, New York, and Punta Gorda, Florida, with 737 and McDonnell Douglas MD-80 jets.

Elite Airways began operating at the airport in 2014 with flights to Washington Dulles International Airport.

In 2015, there were an estimated 15,000 paid attendees to the annual air show over a two-day weekend.

The airport's first scheduled international service was announced by Porter Airlines in September 2015 to Toronto's island airport. The airline discontinued service to the airport in 2019.

In 2015, the airport changed its name to "Orlando Melbourne International Airport". Airport and local tourism officials wanted to brand the airport as a less-congested alternative to Orlando's two airports. They also believed it would attract visitors who wanted to see Walt Disney World, Cape Canaveral, and the area's beaches.

In 2017, a $20 million upgrade was proposed for the airport, 90 percent coming from FAA funds, almost $1 million from FDOT and $1 million from the airport.

In November 2019, British tour operator and airline TUI Airways announced that, from 2022, they would switch their Orlando operations from their current base at Sanford to Melbourne. This announcement will see a total of 17 weekly flights to/from 8 British airports and is to bring their operations nearer to Port Canaveral where TUI's Marella Cruises will sail from in coming years. As a package tour operator, this brings passengers closer to their cruises, although it has angered many TUI passengers who fly with the company to visit Orlando with Walt Disney World  and Universal Orlando Resort due to the extended airport transfer time.

In July 2021, the airport announced a $61 million renovation and expansion, in part to prepare for the arrival of TUI Airways' operations from the United Kingdom.

Facilities and aircraft

The airport covers 2,420 acres (979 ha) and has three asphalt runways: 09R/27L is 10,181 × 150 ft (3,103 × 46 m), 09L/27R is 6,000 × 150 ft (1,829 × 46 m) and 05/23 is 3,001 × 75 ft (915 × 23 m). The main terminal building is named the Edward L. Foster Air Terminal.

In the year ending December 31, 2020, the airport had 103,660 aircraft operations, average 284 per day; 93% were general aviation, 4% scheduled commercial, 2% air taxi and less than 1% military. 264 aircraft at the time were based at this airport: 186 single-engine, 42 multiengine, 26 jet, 9 helicopter, and 1 military.

The Airport Museum was in the terminal building. However, the new expansion that occurred, demolished the museum and replaced with a news and gift shop.

The Florida Institute of Technology Research, Science and Technology Park covers about  surrounded by airport tenants such as Northrop Grumman , G.E Railway, Rockwell Collins, DRS Technologies, and L-3Harris, and leases property to two hospitals and one hotel.

A new Embraer Business Jet Assembly Facility, intended to employ 200 workers, is under construction. Production facilities are for the Phenom 100 and 300, and Legacy 450 and 500.

In 2010 two companies, AAR Corporation and MidAirUSA, announced plans for facilities at the airport. The companies intended to respectively employ 225 and 300 people. MidAirUSA went bankrupt in 2015; Aeromod International took over the MidAirUSA hangar in 2016.

Public Safety
The airport is serviced by the Melbourne Airport Authority Police Department for law enforcement services, and by the Melbourne Fire Department for fire and rescue services.

Airlines and destinations

Statistics

Traffic figures
Monthly passengers were at a seasonal low in September 2007 at 14,083. A high was experienced in March 2010 of 41,725. Total enplaned and deplaned passengers for 2008 numbered about 286,000. 229,000 passengers used the airport in 2009, a 24% drop from 2008. Passengers rose 70% in 2010 over 2009, as US Airways restarted service and Delta expanded.

Top destinations

Airline market share

Flight schools
F.I.T. Aviation Flight School owned by Florida Institute of Technology for the College of Aeronautics. Offers flight training for fixed wing aircraft for the FAA Private Pilot Certification, Instrument Rating, Commercial Pilot Certification, Multi-Engine and Advanced Aircraft Training. In 1999, to match a grant for a new engineering building, Florida Tech sold nearly a third of its training fleet.
Melbourne Flight Training

Incidents at MLB
On March 17, 1958, an Eastern Air Lines Martin 4-0-4 (flight # unknown) on final approach to MLB struck an unmarked pile of gravel at the approach end of the runway. During the landing roll, the landing gear leg collapsed and the aircraft caught fire and burned. All 10 occupants (3 crew, 7 passengers) evacuated safely.

References

External links

 Melbourne International Airport, official site
 FIT Aviation, official site
 
 

Airports in Florida
Airports in Brevard County, Florida
Airports established in 1928
World War II airfields in the United States
Florida Institute of Technology
Transportation in Melbourne, Florida
Buildings and structures in Melbourne, Florida
1928 establishments in Florida